The 2018 CS Nebelhorn Trophy was held in September 2018 at the Eissportzentrum Oberstdorf. It is part of the 2018–19 ISU Challenger Series. Medals were awarded in the disciplines of men's singles, ladies' singles, pair skating, and ice dance.

Entries 
The International Skating Union published the list of entries on August 28, 2018.

Changes to preliminary assignments

Records 

The following new ISU best scores were set during this competition:

Results

Men

Ladies

Pairs

Ice dance

References

Citations 

CS Nebelhorn Trophy
Nebelhorn Trophy